Verónica Lope Fontagne (born 1 February 1952) is a Spanish politician from the People's Party who served as an Member of the European Parliament from 2009 to 2019.

References 

Living people
1952 births
People's Party (Spain) politicians
Politicians from Bordeaux
MEPs for Spain 2009–2014
MEPs for Spain 2014–2019
People's Party (Spain) MEPs
21st-century Spanish women politicians